Saigusaozephyrus is a butterfly genus in the family Lycaenidae. It is monotypic, containing only the species Saigusaozephyrus atabyrius..S. atabyrius is  endemic to West China.

References

Theclini
Monotypic butterfly genera
Lycaenidae genera